Wallenia xylosteoides is a species of plant in the family Primulaceae. It is endemic to Jamaica. It is threatened by habitat loss.

References

xylosteoides
Vulnerable plants
Endemic flora of Jamaica
Taxonomy articles created by Polbot